Francisco Gomes is a Portuguese name which may refer to:
 Chico (footballer, born 1988), full name Francisco Miguel Franco Antunes Gomes, Portuguese footballer
 Chiquinho Baiano (born 1980), full name Francisco Gomes de Andrade Junior (born 1980), Brazilian footballer.
 Francisco Gomes da Rocha, (1745–1808), Brazilian composer 
 Francisco Gomes de Amorim, (1827–1891), Portuguese poet and Dramatist
 Francisco da Costa Gomes (1914–2001), Portuguese military officer and politician, the 15th President of the Portuguese Republic
 Francisco Dias Gomes (1745–1795), Portuguese poet and literary critic 
 Francisco Luís Gomes, (1829–1869), Portuguese physician, writer, historian, economist, politician
 Gomes da Costa (footballer), (born 1919), former Portuguese footballer

Other
 Dr Francisco Luis Gomes District Library, the major library in the district of South Goa, Goa, India

See also 
 Francisco (disambiguation)
 Gomes
 Francisco Gómez (disambiguation)